Maryam Rahimi is an Iranian professional footballer who plays as a midfielder for the Iran women's national team.

International goals

External links 
 
 

Living people
Iranian women's footballers
Women's association football midfielders
Iran women's international footballers
People from Gorgan
1994 births
21st-century Iranian women